The Oakeley Baronetcy, of Shrewsbury, is a title in the Baronetage of Great Britain. It was created on 5 June 1790 for the Indian administrator Charles Oakeley. He served as Governor of Madras from 1790 to 1794. Frederick Oakeley was the second son of the first Baronet.

Oakeley baronets, of Shrewsbury (1790)
Sir Charles Oakeley, 1st Baronet (1751–1826)
Sir Charles Oakeley, 2nd Baronet (1778–1829)
Sir Herbert Oakeley, 3rd Baronet (1791–1845)
Sir Charles William Atholl Oakeley, 4th Baronet (1828–1915)
Sir Charles John Oakeley, 5th Baronet (1862–1938)
Sir Charles Richard Andrew Oakeley, 6th Baronet (1900–1959)
Sir (Edward) Atholl Oakeley, 7th Baronet (1900–1987)
Sir John Digby Atholl Oakeley, 8th Baronet (1932–2016)
 Sir Robert John Atholl Oakeley, 9th Baronet (1963–)

The heir apparent to the baronetcy is William Robert Atholl Oakeley (b. 1995).

Notes

Baronetcies in the Baronetage of Great Britain
1790 establishments in Great Britain